Demodex  is a genus of tiny mites that live in or near hair follicles of mammals.  Around 65 species of Demodex are known. Two species live on humans: Demodex folliculorum and Demodex brevis, both frequently referred to as eyelash mites, alternatively face mites or skin mites. Different species of animals host different species of Demodex. Demodex canis lives on the domestic dog. The presence of Demodex species on mammals is common and usually does not cause any symptoms, although occasionally some skin diseases can be caused by the mites. Demodex is derived from Greek δημός dēmos "fat" and δήξ dēx, "woodworm".

Notable species

D. folliculorum and D. brevis

D. folliculorum and D. brevis are typically found on humans. D. folliculorum was first described in 1842 by Simon; D. brevis was identified as separate in 1963 by Akbulatova. D. folliculorum is found in hair follicles, while D. brevis lives in sebaceous glands connected to hair follicles. Both species are primarily found in the face  near the nose, the eyelashes, and eyebrows  but also occur elsewhere on the body. D. folliculorum is occasionally found as a cause of folliculitis, although most people with D. folliculorum mites have no obvious ill effects.

Each has a semitransparent, elongated body that consists of two fused segments. Eight short, segmented legs are attached to the first body segment. The body is covered with scales for anchoring itself in the hair follicle, and the mite has pin-like mouthparts for eating skin cells and oils that accumulate in the hair follicles. The mites are transferred between hosts through contact with hair, eyebrows, and the sebaceous glands of the face.

Females of D. folliculorum are larger and rounder than males. Both male and female Demodex mites have a genital opening, and fertilization is internal. Mating takes place in the follicle opening, and eggs are laid inside the hair follicles or sebaceous glands. The six-legged larvae hatch after 3–4 days, and the larvae develop into adults in about 7 days. The total lifespan of a Demodex mite is several weeks.

Health issues
Older people are much more likely to carry face mites; about a third of children and young adults, half of adults, and two-thirds of elderly people carry them. The lower rate in children may be because children produce less sebum, or simply have had less time to acquire the mite. A 2014 study of 29 people in North Carolina, USA, found that all of the adults (19) carried mites, and that 70% of those under 18 years of age carried mites. This study (using a DNA-detection method, more sensitive than traditional sampling and observation by microscope), along with several studies of cadavers, suggests that previous work might have underestimated the mites' prevalence. The small sample size and small geographical area involved prevent drawing broad conclusions from these data.

Research
Research about human infestation by Demodex mites is ongoing:

 Evidence of a correlation between Demodex infestation and acne vulgaris exists, suggesting it may play a role in promoting acne, including in immunocompetent infants displaying pityriasis and erythema toxicum neonatorum, or simply that Demodex mites thrive in the same oily conditions where acne bacteria thrive.
 Several preliminary studies suggest an association between mite infestation and rosacea.
Demodex mites can cause blepharitis, which can be greatly reduced with solutions of tea tree oil containing 50% concentrations or greater.
 Demodex mite eradication responds to topical treatments better than oral and intravenous treatments alone. More than one treatment may be required for individuals with prolonged Demodex mite infestation.
 Demodex mites causing a reaction in healthy individuals depends on genealogy. Mites may evolve differently with different bloodlines.
 New studies suggest demodex mites involved in psoriasis, allergic rhinitis, and seborrheic dermatitis in immunosuppressed individuals. (24)(25)(26)

 Atopic triad is widely known as atopic dermatitis, allergic rhinitis and asthma.(28)" Consequently, it has been suggested that effective management of atopic dermatitis could deter the progression of the atopic march, therefore preventing or at least reducing the subsequent development of asthma and allergic rhinitis"(27)

D. canis

The natural host of D. canis is the domestic dog. D. canis mites can survive on immunosuppressed human skin and human mites can infect immunosuppressed dogs, although reported cases are rare. Ivermectin is used for demodex mites requiring up to four treatments to eradicate in humans; although only one treatment is usually given to dogs to reduce mite count. Naturally, the D. canis mite has a commensal relationship with the dog, and under normal conditions does not produce any clinical signs or disease. The escalation of a commensal D. canis infestation into one requiring clinical attention usually involves complex immune factors. Under normal health conditions, the mite can live within the dermis of the dog without causing any harm to the animal. However, whenever an immunosuppressive condition is present and the dog's immune system (which normally ensures that the mite population cannot escalate to an infestation that can damage the dermis of the host) is compromised, it allows the mites to proliferate. As they continue to infest the host, clinical signs begin to become apparent and demodicosis/demodectic mange/red mange is diagnosed.

Since "D. canis" is a part of the natural fauna on a canine's skin, the mite is not considered to be contagious. Many dogs receive an initial exposure from their mothers while nursing, during the first few days of life. The immune system of the healthy animal keeps the population of the mite in check, so subsequent exposure to dogs possessing clinical demodectic mange does not increase an animal's chance of developing demodicosis. Subsequent infestations after treatment can occur.

D. canis was first described by Franz Leydig in 1859.

References

(24)
 TY  - JOUR
AU  - Yengil, Erhan
AU  - Cevik, Cengiz
AU  - Aycan Kaya, Özlem
AU  - Taner, Melis
AU  - Akkoca, Ayse
AU  - Ozer, Cahit
PY  - 2014/01/01
SP  - 27
EP  - 31
T1  - Relationship between demodex folliculorum and allergic rhinitis in adults
VL  - 30
JO  - Acta Medica Mediterranea
ER  - https://www.researchgate.net/publication/288367546_Relationship_between_demodex_folliculorum_and_allergic_rhinitis_in_adults

(25)
https://pubmed.ncbi.nlm.nih.gov/24314384/
Ramos-E-Silva M, Sampaio AL, Carneiro S. Red face revisited: Endogenous dermatitis in the form of atopic dermatitis and seborrheic dermatitis. Clin Dermatol. 2014 Jan-Feb;32(1):109-15. doi: 10.1016/j.clindermatol.2013.05.032. PMID: 24314384.

(28)https://www.ncbi.nlm.nih.gov/books/NBK448071/
Atopic Dermatitis
Kolb L, Ferrer-Bruker SJ.
Affiliations
1 VCOM/Orange Park Medical Center
Copyright © 2022, StatPearls Publishing LLC.

(27)
https://www.ncbi.nlm.nih.gov/pmc/articles/PMC4635175/
Belgrave, Danielle C M et al. “Atopic Dermatitis and Respiratory Allergy: What is the Link.” Current dermatology reports vol. 4,4 (2015): 221-227. doi:10.1007/s13671-015-0121-6
pg2

(26)
https://www.medicaljournals.se/acta/content/html/10.2340/00015555-3485
Allergic Rhinitis and Asthma Among Adolescents with Psoriasis: A Population-based Cross-sectional Study
Eran Galili1#, Aviv Barzilai1#, Gilad Twig2–4, Tomm Caspi2, Danny Daniely5, Rony Shreberk-Hassidim6 and Nadav Astman1,2

External links

 Demodex, an inhabitant of human hair follicles, and a mite which we live with in harmony, by M. Halit Umar, published in the May 2000 edition of Micscape Magazine, includes several micrographs
 
 Demodetic Mange in Dogs, by T. J. Dunn, Jr. DVM

Parasitic acari
Parasitic arthropods of mammals
Trombidiformes genera
Human eyelashes